Luis Antonio Velásquez Quiroa (born 24 July 1962) is a Guatemalan   businessman and former presidential candidate. He served as Guatemala's minister of Economy until January 2012.

References

Living people
Guatemalan economists
Government ministers of Guatemala
1962 births